Shab deg or shab daig is slow cooked turnip and mutton stew, traditionally left to simmer overnight. "Shab" means 'night' and "daig" means 'cooking pot' in the Persian language. The dish has been described as Mughlai origin from the Kashmir Valley.

References

Pakistani cuisine
Kashmiri cuisine
Lamb dishes